Lake Force (or Lakeforce) was a unit of the British Army stationed in the Uganda Protectorate on the west coast of Lake Victoria under the command of Brigadier-General Sir Charles Crewe in 1916, during the East African campaign of the First World War (1914–18). It consisted of 2,800 soldiers and 10,000 porters. In May 1916, Lake Force sent 5,000 porters and 100 oxwagons to serve with their allies, the Force publique of the Belgian Congo under Charles Tombeur. The Uganda Native Medical Corps (UNMC) served with both units.

Lake Force cooperated with the Belgians during the Tabora Offensive in German East Africa, usually subordinating their own desires to Belgian. The initial British objective was Mwanza, which fell on 14 July 1916. Over 40,000 loads were stockpiled there by 19 September, but Mwanza's value as a base was minimized by lack of porters to carry them southwards. Lake Force's logistics problems were severe. The area south of Mwanza was waterless and completely stripped of resources by the Germans. On 28 August, Lake Force captured Shinyanga without fighting. A letter by Crewe intended for Lieutenant-Colonel Philippe François Joseph Molitor, commander of the Northern Brigade, and stating that the British assault on Tabora would begin on 19 September was on the 16th intercepted by the Germans, who then abandoned the town on the night of 18–19 September. The Belgians occupied it the next day, and Lake Force camped outside it to the east. On 3 October, after the Allies had established control of the African Great Lakes region, Lake Force was disbanded. Some of its Ugandan medics were sent to serve with the Uganda Field Ambulance in the 4th battalion of the King's African Rifles.

Notes

References

Military units and formations of the British Army in World War I
British colonial regiments